Aji or AJI may refer to:

Location 
Aji (town), Tieling County, Liaoning, China
Aji Island, Miyagi Prefecture, Japan
Aji, Kagawa, Kagawa Prefecture, Japan
Aji River (disambiguation), rivers with the same name

Other 
Aji (Go), a latent troublesome weakness or other possibility in a position in the game of Go
Aji (Ryūkyū), a historical title and rank in the Ryukyu Islands
 Ají (sauce) a condiment made with cilantro, green onions, and garlic
Aji Assamese Daily, a newspaper in Assam, India
 Ají pepper (Capsicum baccatum), a pepper that originated in ancient Peru
Ağrı Airport (IATA code AJI), near the city of Ağrı, Ağrı Province, Turkey
Al Jazeera English, an Arab television channel formerly called "Al-Jazeera International"
Alliance of Independent Journalists, an Indonesian journalists organization
American Jujitsu Institute, an American jujitsu organization founded by Henry Okazaki in 1939
A female Hajji in Wolof, variation: Ajaratou
Japanese horse mackerel, found around the coast of Japan